Sam Querrey was the defending champion, but lost in the first round to Matthew Ebden.

Juan Martín del Potro won the title, defeating Kevin Anderson in the final, 6–4, 6–4.

Seeds

Draw

Finals

Top half

Bottom half

Qualifying

Seeds

Qualifiers

Lucky losers

Qualifying draw

First qualifier

Second qualifier

Third qualifier

Fourth qualifier

References
Main draw
Qualifying draw

2018 Abierto Mexicano Telcel